The Belgium Open is a darts tournament that has been held since 1982.

List of winners

Men's

Women's

Tournament records
 Most wins 3:  Martin Adams,  Eric Bristow
 Most Finals 3:  John Walton,  Ted Hankey,  Martin Adams,  Mike Gregory. 
 Most Semi Finals 5:  Ted Hankey,  Raymond van Barneveld.
 Most Quarter Finals 7:  Raymond van Barneveld.
 Most Appearances 10:  Ted Hankey.
 Most Prize Money won £2,479:  Dean Winstanley
 Best winning average (-) :     v's
 Youngest Winner age 19:   Willem Kralt. 
 Oldest Winner age 57:  Martin Adams.

References

External links

1976 establishments in Belgium
Darts tournaments